The Brazil-nut poison frog (Adelphobates castaneoticus) is a species of frog in the family Dendrobatidae. It is endemic to the state of Pará in Brazil. The frog is believed to have received its common name from the fact that its tadpoles sometimes develop in the hard capsules of the Brazil nut tree, which are common in its range. The nuts fall to the forest floor where they are broken open by agoutis and other animals seeking the seeds, and empty husks fill with water.

Description
The dorsal surface is of a shiny black colour with spots and markings of white or various shades of yellow. There is a bright yellow or orange spot where the foreleg joins the body and two more similarly coloured spots on either side of the knee joint on the hind leg, which combine to make a single large spot when the animal is stationary. A further spot on the underside of the calf is only visible from below.

Distribution
The Brazil-nut poison frog is endemic to the rainforest of central Brazil. These locations are some distance apart and it is likely that this frog has a more widespread distribution than is known but has passed undetected in other parts of its range. It lives among the leaf litter on the forest floor and sometimes climbs into low vegetation.

Biology
The Brazil-nut poison frog is diurnal and feeds on ants, termites and other small invertebrates. The eggs are laid on the ground where they are guarded by the male. When they hatch, it carries the tadpoles to temporary pools such as water holes in trees and stumps, and water-filled empty nut cases on the forest floor. Here the tadpoles develop rapidly, devouring mosquito larvae, smaller tadpoles, and other creatures that share these ephemeral pools, as well as suitably-sized plant material. This frog may become sexually mature in five to seven months.

Status
The Brazil-nut poison frog is common within its range and the population trend seems stable, although data on its conservation status is somehow insufficient. As a result, the IUCN lists its conservation status as being of "least concern". The main threats it faces are logging, habitat destruction, wildfire and collection of animals to be sold as pets on an international market. There are some conservation areas within its range.

References

External links

Adelphobates
Endemic fauna of Brazil
Amphibians of Brazil
Amphibians described in 1990
Taxonomy articles created by Polbot